Code page 860 (CCSID 860) (also known as CP 860, IBM 00860, OEM 860, DOS Portuguese) is a code page used under DOS in Portugal to write Portuguese and it is also suitable to write Spanish and Italian. In Brazil, however, the most widespread codepage – and that which DOS in Brazilian portuguese used by default – was code page 850.

Character set
The following table shows code page 860. Each character is shown with its equivalent Unicode code point. Only the second half of the table (code points 128–255) is shown, the first half (code points 0–127) being the same as code page 437.

References

860